Protoblepharus apatani is a species of skink.

References

Protoblepharus
Reptiles described in 2022